Sjoerd Huisman (19 June 1986 – 30 December 2013) was a Dutch speed skater who specialised in marathon speed skating.

Career
Huisman made his debut in marathon speed skating in 2005 to become one of the best sprinters in the peloton. His biggest success was winning the Dutch championship on natural ice in 2009 at the Oostvaardersplassen. A year later Huisman won the Essent Cup and the Dutch Open at the Austrian Weissensee.

Huisman was also successful in inline skating. In 2010 he won the Dutch marathon championship.

In May 2011, Huisman was involved in a car accident after he blacked-out behind the wheel. Seven months later he returned to the peloton.

Honours
 Dutch national marathon speed skating champion: 1 time
 Dutch national marathon inlineskating champion: 1 time

Personal longtrack records

Personal life and death
His sister, Mariska Huisman, is one of the Netherlands' most successful female marathon speed skaters.

On 30 December 2013, Huisman died of cardiac arrest, aged only 27. He had finished only second to Arjan Stroetinga in one of his final races, on 22 December 2013.

References

External links
 Profile - Schaatspeloton

1986 births
2013 deaths
People from Andijk
Dutch male speed skaters
Inline speed skaters
Sportspeople from North Holland